Boris Leonidovich Tsilevitch (born March 26, 1956) is a Latvian politician. He was born in Daugavpils. He is a member of Harmony and a deputy of the Saeima. He began his current term in parliament on October 17, 2011.

From May to July 2004 Tsilevitch briefly served as Member of the European Parliament between the accession of Latvia and the first direct election of Latvian MEPs. During that time, he was a member of the Committee on Petitions.

In addition to his role in parliament, Tsilevitch has been serving as member of the Latvian delegation to the Parliamentary Assembly of the Council of Europe since 2011. As member of Harmony, he is part of the Socialist Group. He is currently the chairperson of the Committee on the Election of Judges to the European Court of Human Rights; a member of the Committee on the Honouring of Obligations and Commitments by Member States of the Council of Europe (Monitoring Committee); a member of the Committee on Equality and Non-Discrimination; a member of the Sub-Committee on the implementation of judgments of the European Court of Human Rights; and a member Sub-Committee on the Rights of Minorities. Alongside Kerstin Lundgren of Sweden, he serves as the Assembly's co-rapporteur on Georgia.

References 

https://web.archive.org/web/20090331121310/http://assembly.coe.int/ASP/AssemblyList/AL_MemberDetails.asp?MemberID=4135
http://www.cvk.lv/cgi-bin/wdbcgiw/base/saeima9.cvkand9.kandid2?NR1=&cbutton=78106837818

External links 
Personal website 
Saeima website 

1956 births
Living people
Politicians from Daugavpils
Jewish Latvian politicians
Latvian people of Russian-Jewish descent
National Harmony Party politicians
Social Democratic Party "Harmony" politicians
Deputies of the 7th Saeima
Deputies of the 8th Saeima
Deputies of the 9th Saeima
Deputies of the 10th Saeima
Deputies of the 11th Saeima
Deputies of the 12th Saeima
Deputies of the 13th Saeima
Minority rights activists
University of Latvia alumni